Wasoora Pulwama, also known as Wasoor, is a village in Shahoora Tehsil of Pulwama district of Jammu and Kashmir in India. It is located 14 km (8.7 mi) towards East from District headquarters Pulwama and 50 km from State capital Srinagar.

See also 

 Chakoora Pulwama
 Panzgam Pulwama
 Tahab Pulwama

References

Villages in Pulwama district